Dhubri Lok Sabha constituency is one of the 14 Lok Sabha constituencies in Assam state in north-eastern India. Dhubri consists of 10 assembly segments of Lower Assam, covering all of South Salmara-Mankachar District and Dhubri districts and part of Goalpara district.

Assembly segments
Dhubri Lok Sabha constituency is composed of the following assembly segments:

Members of Parliament

Election results

General elections 2019

General elections 2014

See also
 Dhubri district
 South Salmara-Mankachar District
 Goalpara District
 List of Constituencies of the Lok Sabha

References

Lok Sabha constituencies in Assam
Dhubri district